La Bruyère may refer to:

 La Bruyère, Belgium, a municipality
 La Bruyère, Haute-Saône, a commune in France
 Jean de La Bruyère (1645–1696), French essayist and moralist
 Louis-Claude Chéron de La Bruyère (1758–1807), French playwright, translator and politician

See also
 Labruyère (disambiguation)
 Bruyère (disambiguation)
 Bruguière, a surname